The Shepherd of the Hills is a 1941 American drama film starring John Wayne, Betty Field and Harry Carey. The supporting cast includes Beulah Bondi, Ward Bond, Marjorie Main and John Qualen.  The picture was Wayne's first film in Technicolor and was based on the novel of the same name by Harold Bell Wright.  The director was Henry Hathaway, who directed several other Wayne films including True Grit almost three decades later.

The story was filmed previously in the silent era by author Wright himself in 1919, released on State Rights basis. It was filmed again, in The Shepherd of the Hills (1928 film), starring Molly O'Day at First National Pictures, and later, in color in 1964.

The film also prominently features two uncredited pieces of music.  The first is used as a leit motif to represent the spirit of Young Matt's deceased mother: the Wiegenlied ("Guten Abend, gut' Nacht" [1868]) of Johannes Brahms, commonly known in English as the Brahms Lullaby.  The second uncredited composition was "There's A Happy Hunting Ground," words and music copyrighted by Sam Coslow, sung by "Fuzzy" Knight, accompanied by an a cappella onscreen chorus in multi-voiced harmony; the song is sung again by the chorus alone over the closing credits.

Cast
 John Wayne as Young Matt
 Betty Field as Sammy Lane
 Harry Carey as Daniel Howitt
 Beulah Bondi as Aunt Mollie
 James Barton as Old Matt
 Samuel S. Hinds as Andy Beeler
 Marjorie Main as Granny Becky
 Ward Bond as Wash Gibbs
 Marc Lawrence as Pete
 John Qualen as Coot Royal
 Fuzzy Knight as Mr. Palestrom
 Tom Fadden as Jim Lane
 Olin Howland as Corky
 Dorothy Adams as Elvy
 Virita Campbell as Baby
 Selmer Jackson as Doctor (uncredited)

Production
Filming took place in Big Bear Lake and Moon Ridge, California.

Differences from the novel
Only a few plot elements and characters from the novel are used in the 1941 film, and those are depicted differently, so it is basically a different story.

While the novel interposed fiction with portrayals of actual persons residing in the Missouri Ozarks, in the early Branson area, the film departed markedly from the book's presentations. Old Matt, a patriarch, mill owner and influential person within the community, is presented in the film as a doddering fool, henpecked by his wife, Aunt Mollie. In the novel she's a nurturing, kindly, loyal wife and friend, but in this film she is a shrill, nasty moonshiner. The "Shepherd" of the title, a cultured, sympathetic visitor from Chicago who contributes positively to the society he's visiting, in this film is an aging ex-convict.  In total odds with the book, he is here Young Matt's (John Wayne's) messianic father, with a shootout perpetrated by "Big John." Other characters differ as markedly from Wright's novel.

See also
 John Wayne filmography

References

External links

 
 
 
 
 

1941 films
1941 drama films
American drama films
1940s English-language films
Films based on American novels
Films directed by Henry Hathaway
Films shot in Big Bear Lake, California
Paramount Pictures films
1940s American films